Pricop is a surname. Notable people with this surname include:

 Mihai Radu Pricop (1950–2018), Romanian senator 
 Mitică Pricop (born 1977), Romanian sprint canoer

Romanian-language surnames